Druim Fada (744 m) is a mountain in the Northwest Highlands of Scotland. It lies on the northern shore of Loch Eil in Lochaber, near the village of Corpach.

Taking the form of a long ridge running east to west, the peak is mostly grassy in nature although it has a number of shallow corries on its northern side. Its summit is known as Stob a' Ghrianain.

References

Mountains and hills of the Northwest Highlands
Marilyns of Scotland
Grahams